Paul Pachner (October 17, 1871 - October 13,1937) was an Austro–Hungarian admiral who served during World War I. He commanded the protected cruiser SMS Zenta during the Battle of Antivari in 1914, where it was sunk in an unequal battle with a large French fleet. After the war, he served in the Spanish merchant marine, then aboard the Khedive of Egypt's private yacht, and finally aboard a Yugoslav collier.

References

Austro-Hungarian military personnel of World War I
1871 births
1937 deaths
Austro-Hungarian admirals